Robin Luke (born 20 March 1942, Los Angeles, California, United States) is an American rock and roll singer who is best known for his 1958 song, "Susie Darlin'". He later worked as a University professor in Marketing. Luke has been enshrined in the Rockabilly Hall of Fame.

Biography
Robin Luke was discovered by Hawaii entrepreneur Kimo Wilder McVay. Luke was living in Honolulu, Hawaii, attending Punahou School, in 1958 when he wrote and recorded "Susie Darlin'", a song named after his then five-year-old sister, Susie. The track reached #5 on the Billboard Hot 100 and #23 on the UK Singles Chart, selling over one million copies and earning a gold disc. He continued to record, but was unable to repeat his chart success. His first four singles were recorded for the small International Records label in Honolulu.  After "Susie Darlin'" started getting local airplay, Dot Records bought his recording contract and the International master tapes.

Robin Luke stated that he never envisioned pursuing music as a career and quit the professional music business in 1965. As of 2012, he still performs occasionally on the side. He received his Ph.D. in Business Administration and Marketing at the University of Missouri-Columbia, and served as a professor at Old Dominion University, the University of the Virgin Islands, and Missouri State University. He became Department Head at Old Dominion University and Missouri State University.

Discography

Singles
 "Susie Darlin'" b/w "Living's Loving You" (International 206, 1957 & Dot 15781, 1958)
 "Hound Dog" b/w (International 206, 1958 & Dot 15781, 1958)
 "My Girl" b/w "Chicka Chicka Honey" (International 208, 1957 & Dot 15839,1958)
 "You Can't Stop Me From Dreaming" b/w ""Strollin' Blues" (International 210, 1957 & Dot 15899, 1959)
 "Five Minutes More" b/w "Won't You Please Me Mine?" (International 212, 1958 & Dot 15959, 1959)
 "Make Me A Dreamer" b/w "Walkin' In The Moonlight" (Dot 16001, 1959)
 "Bad Boy" b/w "School Bus Love Affair" (Dot 16040, 1960)
 "Everlovin'" b/w "Well Oh, Well Oh" (Dot 16096, 1960)
 "Part Of A Fool" b/w "Poor Little Rich Boy" (Dot 16229,1961)
 "My Pink Velvet Shoes" b/w(International 212, 1959 & Dot 15959, 1959)
 "Foggin' Up The Windows with My Guy" b/w "Wound Time" (Dot 16366, 1962)

Albums
 Susie Darlin' (Dot 1092  10", 1958)

References

External links
Official site, biography
Rockabillyhall.com 
 Answers 
RCS.law.emory.edu

1942 births
Living people
American male singers
American rock singers
Singers from Los Angeles
Dot Records artists
University of Missouri alumni